Ellinora Jillian Overton (born 13 June 1974) is a former backstroke and medley swimmer, who competed in three consecutive Summer Olympics for Australia, starting in 1992.

Olympic career 

After narrowly missing a bronze medal at the 1991 World Championships in the 200-metre individual medley, Overton went on to a 5th-place finish at the 1992 Summer Olympics in Barcelona, Spain.  She won the bronze medal in the 200-metre individual medley at the inaugural 1993 FINA Short Course World Championships in Palma de Mallorca, Spain, followed by the gold medal two years later at the 1995 FINA Short Course World Championships in Rio de Janeiro.  After winning a bronze medal at the 1994 World Championships, she moved from Sydney to Brisbane to train with Susan O'Neill and Samantha Riley under coach Scott Volkers.

Overton again finished 5th at the 1996 Summer Olympics in Atlanta, after which she moved to Berkeley, California to train, compete and study at the University of California, Berkeley.  Overton retired from swimming after graduating with high honors from the Haas School of Business and finishing 11th at the 2000 Summer Olympics in Sydney.

Personal life 

She attended St Ives High School in Sydney, where she still holds many swimming carnival records. When living in Sydney, Overton trained with former Olympian Gary Winram.

See also
 List of World Aquatics Championships medalists in swimming (women)
 List of Commonwealth Games medallists in swimming (women)

References
 Australian Olympic Committee

1974 births
Living people
Olympic swimmers of Australia
Australian female medley swimmers
Swimmers at the 1992 Summer Olympics
Swimmers at the 1996 Summer Olympics
Swimmers at the 2000 Summer Olympics
Swimmers from Vancouver
Australian people of Canadian descent
Swimmers at the 1994 Commonwealth Games
Commonwealth Games gold medallists for Australia
World Aquatics Championships medalists in swimming
Medalists at the FINA World Swimming Championships (25 m)
Commonwealth Games silver medallists for Australia
Commonwealth Games bronze medallists for Australia
Commonwealth Games medallists in swimming
Universiade medalists in swimming
Universiade silver medalists for Australia
Universiade bronze medalists for Australia
Medalists at the 1997 Summer Universiade
20th-century Australian women
Medallists at the 1994 Commonwealth Games